Peter Gaya Kaam Se is a 2014 Hindi action adventure film directed by John Owen. The film has only ever been screened once under the title, The Goa Run, at the Raindance Film Festival in London in September 2014.

Plot
Peter, a football crazy motorcycle taxi rider, decides to turn his back on Goa and quits his job - until his sleazy loan shark boss Bosco persuades him to do one last job. It's the job that will change his life forever.

Cast
 Rajeev Khandelwal as Peter
 Lekha Washington as Mira
 Isha Talwar
 Prashant Narayanan as Carlos
 Raj Singh Arora
 Rachit Trehan as KJ
 Rajesh Tailang

Production
Following the success of his first film Aamir, UTV Motion Pictures re-signed Rajeev Khandelwal in June 2008 to be a part of their next film to be directed by British film maker John Owen. Shooting of the film, described as an action adventure, began on location in Goa India in August 2008. Alphonse Roy was signed on as cinematographer to shoot the film in 35mm. Actress Lekha Washington was added to the cast to make her first Hindi film appearance, after successfully coming through auditions.

The film was subsequently completed with the actors finishing their scenes and dubbing duties, before the production house suffered financial problems and release plans were stalled. The failure of UTV's big budget films meant that the studio considered releasing Peter Gaya Kaam Se as a direct-to-television film, though this did not materialise.

Following a video appeal from director John Owen's 80-year-old mother in May 2014, Disney was forced to agree to showcase the film at the 2014 London Raindance Film Festival. Owen subsequently completed a fully mastered and subtitled version of the film at his own cost for the one time only screening on 27 September 2014 at Vue Cinema, Picadilly Circus, London under the title of The Goa Run.

References

External links
Peter Gaya Kaam Se Official Website
 

2014 films
2010s Hindi-language films
2010s adventure films
UTV Motion Pictures films